Áine Murphy MLA is a Sinn Féin politician who is a Member of the Legislative Assembly from Fermanagh and South Tyrone in Northern Ireland.

Political career 
She was co-opted to the Assembly in 2021. In March 2022, she introduced a fracking prohibition bill.

She was elected in the 2022 Northern Ireland Assembly election for Fermanagh and South Tyrone.

References 

Living people
Northern Ireland MLAs 2017–2022
Sinn Féin MLAs
Female members of the Northern Ireland Assembly
21st-century women politicians from Northern Ireland
Year of birth missing (living people)
Northern Ireland MLAs 2022–2027